Kasauti is a 1974 Bollywood drama film directed and produced by Aravind Sen. It stars Amitabh Bachchan, Hema Malini, Pran in lead roles.

Synopsis 
Sapna (Hema Malini), a slum dweller of Bombay seeks refuge from a drunken outburst of her foster father (Satyendra Kappu). Heera (Ramesh Deo), a playboy smuggler, has an eye on Sapna and wants to have her for his pleasure. Amit (Amitabh Bachchan), an educated taxi driver saves Sapna from the clutches of Heera but soon she is accused of attempting robbery and sent to prison. In a fit of anger, Sapna's mother (Sulochana Latkar) kills Sapna's foster father.

Amit promises to marry Sapna on her acquittal but on the eve of their marriage Amit's father (Murad) refuses to accept Sapna. Not wanting to break up Amit's family Sapna decides to walk out of his life and leaves the city.

Amit and his friend Pyarelal (Pran) search for Sapna but do not succeed. In Calcutta, Sapna becomes an instant hit on the stage through Ashok Babu (Vijay Sharma). One day, Ashok proposes to her and Sapna again leaves. Eventually, she is reunited with Amit.

Cast 
Amitabh Bachchan as Amitabh Sharma "Amit"
Hema Malini as Sapna
Pran as Pyarelal
Sonia Sahni as Neeta
Bharat Bhushan as Neeta's Husband
Mac Mohan as Rajesh 
Ramesh Deo as Heera
Abhi Bhattacharya as Shankar
D. K. Sapru as Hariram
Murad as Amit's Father
Sulochana Latkar as Sapna's Mother
Satyen Kappu as Sapna's Foster Father
Bipin Gupta as Inspector
Ram Sethi as Balu
Mohan Choti as Panchu

Soundtrack
The music was composed by Kalyanji-Anandji, lyrics by Indeevar, Verma Malik & Anand Bakshi.

References

External links 
 

1974 films
1970s Hindi-language films
1974 drama films
Films scored by Kalyanji Anandji